The 2009–10 Nemzeti Bajnokság II competition was a Hungarian domestic rugby club competition operated by the Magyar Rögbi Szövetség (MRgSz). It began on September 6, 2009 with a match between SZTE EHÖK (University of Szeged) and Szentes at the Etelka sori stadion in Szeged, and continued through to the final at the 4th Field of Széktói Stadion on June 19, 2010.

The final was contested by Szentes and Békéscsabai Benny Bulls, with the former winning 40-10.

Competition format
It was divided into the Keleti (Eastern) and Nyugati (Western) sections. There were four teams in the Eastern section and five teams in the Western section. Matches in the Eastern section were played over six rounds, while matches in the Western section were played over ten rounds.

The teams

Table

Eastern section

Table

Western section

Schedule and results
From the official MRgSz site. Within each weekend, matches are to be listed in the following order:
 By date.
 If matches are held on the same day, by kickoff time.
 Otherwise, in alphabetic order of home club.

Eastern section

Rounds 1 to 6
Round 1
 6 September, 15:00 — SZTE EHÖK 28 – 63 Szentes
 4 October, 14:00 — Gödöllői Ördögök 12 – 68 Békéscsabai Benny Bulls

Round 2
 13 September, 16:00 — SZTE EHÖK 7 – 68 Békéscsabai Benny Bulls
 24 October, 15:00 — Szentes 91 – 5 Gödöllői Ördögök

Round 3
 19 September, 15:00 — Békéscsabai Benny Bulls 31 – 12 Szentes
 18 October, 15:00 — Gödöllői Ördögök 12 – 36 SZTE EHÖK

Round 4
 18 April, 14:00 — Békéscsabai Benny Bulls 72 – 14 Gödöllői Ördögök
 24 April, 16:00 — Szentes 26 – 0 SZTE EHÖK

Round 5
 28 March, 14:00 — Gödöllői Ördögök 26 – 0 Szentes
 28 March, 14:00 — Békéscsabai Benny Bulls 26 – 0 SZTE EHÖK

Round 6
 4 April, 14:00 — SZTE EHÖK 30 – 64 Gödöllői Ördögök
 9 May, 14:00 — Szentes 61 – 22 Békéscsabai Benny Bulls

Western section

Rounds 1 to 5
Round 1
 6 September, 16:00 — Fehérvár 55 – 5 Battai Bulldogok III
 7 November, 15:00 — Gyöngyösi Farkasok 10 – 36 Velencei Kék Cápák

Round 2
 12 September, 14:00 — Fehérvár 10 – 49 Medvék
 13 September, 14:00 — Battai Bulldogok III 61 – 0 Gyöngyösi Farkasok

Round 3
 20 September, 14:00 — Velencei Kék Cápák 35 – 7 Battai Bulldogok III
 18 October, 15:00 — Gyöngyösi Farkasok 5 – 24 Medvék

Round 4
 4 October, 14:00 — Gyöngyösi Farkasok 27 – 5 Fehérvár
 4 October, 17:00 — Medvék 48 – 0 Velencei Kék Cápák

Round 5
 25 October, 13:00 — Battai Bulldogok III 28 – 21 Medvék
 25 October, 14:00 — Fehérvár 36 – 10 Velencei Kék Cápák

Rounds 6 to 10
Round 6
 14 March, 14:00 — Velencei Kék Cápák 33 – 5 Gyöngyösi Farkasok
 14 March, 15:00 — Battai Bulldogok III 26 – 0 Fehérvár

Round 7
 27 March, 14:00 — Gyöngyösi Farkasok 65 – 5 Battai Bulldogok III
 27 March, 14:00 — Medvék 24 – 21 Fehérvár

Round 8
 3 April, 14:00 — Medvék 32 – 20 Gyöngyösi Farkasok
 27 May, 18:00 — Velencei Kék Cápák 10 – 32 Battai Bulldogok III

Round 9
 18 April, 15:00 — Fehérvár 0 – 26  Gyöngyösi Farkasok
 25 April, 14:00 — Velencei Kék Cápák 5 – 22 Medvék

Round 10
 8 May, 14:00 — Medvék 35 – 24 Battai Bulldogok III
 9 May, 15:00 — Velencei Kék Cápák 17 – 14 Fehérvár

Playoffs

Quarter-finals

Semi-finals

Third place playoff

Final

References

Nemzeti Bajnoksag II
2009 in Hungarian sport
2010 in Hungarian sport
Rugby union leagues in Hungary